Syro-Malabar Catholic Church of London is a church in Arnos Grove, North London. It is part of the Syro-Malabar Catholic Church, the largest denomination of the Saint Thomas Christians, based mainly in India. It is estimated that there are 55,000 Indian Catholics in the UK.

The church in London was first established in 2002 by the initiative of Fr. Biju john Kochuparampil, and was officially recognised by the three Catholic Dioceses in 2005. The new Coordinator of the church is Rev.Dr. Thomas Parayadyil.

The Syro-Malabar Church London was founded with the initiative of Rev. Fr. Biju John. Though he was staying in Our Lady of Lourdes Church, Newsouthgate, he initiated a process of spiritual renewal among the Syro-Malabar Catholics living in the UK (who had migrated from Kerala to the United Kingdom). Then there was only a very few priests from the Syro-Malabar church living in the UK. With the help of some lay leaders he established around 52 communities in the UK for the Syro-Malabar Church. Rev. Fr. Biju John resigned his post as the first co-ordinator of the Syro-Malabar church, he even sacrificed his place of residence for the future co-ordinator. After his resignation the church in London was looked after by four priests of the same rite.

See also
 Catholic Church in England and Wales

External links
 Syro-Malabar Catholic Church London
 Fr. Biju John's Official Website
 The Syro-Malabar Church official website

 

Indian diaspora in the United Kingdom
London
Eastern Catholicism in the United Kingdom
Eastern Catholic church buildings in London
Churches in the London Borough of Enfield